Chickatawbut (died 1633; also known as Cicatabut and possibly as Oktabiest before 1622) was the sachem, or leader, of a large group of indigenous people known as the Massachusett tribe in what is now eastern Massachusetts, United States, during the initial period of English settlement in the region in the early seventeenth century.

Chickatawbut's home base was Conihasset, near modern Scituate. The sachem's name had many variant spellings in early Massachusetts records. Some argue that he had an alternate name, Oktabiest  His brother was Wassapinewat.

Chickatawbut maintained a base at a small hill known as Moswetuset Hummock, located on Quincy Bay in Boston Harbor. In 1621 he was met there by Plymouth Colony commander Myles Standish and Tisquantum, a Patuxet guide. According to colonist Thomas Morton, "Chickatawbut's mother was buried at Passonagessit, and that the Plymouth people, on one of their visits, incurred his enmity by despoiling her grave of its bear skins." Chickatawbut did not get caught by Standish and his forces, although his warrior, Pecksuot, was killed in the hostilities at the Wessagusset Colony in 1623/24.

He was succeeded around 1655 by Chickatawbut's son, Wompatuck. As a leader of the  Mattakeesett tribe, he became  a friend of the English settlers.

In 1650, five Massachusett Indians testified to the tribal bounds over which Chickatawbut had reigned:

Legacy and honors
In early 1684 the city fathers of Boston sought to secure legal ownership of the Shawmut Peninsula from the descendents of Chickatawbut, the Massachusett sachem at the time William Blaxton first settled on the peninsula, fifty years prior. Such a descendent was located, a sachem named Josias Wampatuck. There is little evidence that this sachem, his grandfather Chickatawbut or any of their people ever inhabited the peninsula, however the lack of formal legal documents involving Indians during the Blaxton sale encouraged the creation of a backdated deed (termed a "quitclaim") which Josias signed on 19 March 1684 (see document at right, and its transcription).

Chickatawbut Road, one of the Blue Hills Reservation Parkways, and Chickatawbut Hill, at  the highest point in Quincy, Massachusetts, are named for this sachem.

References

Native Americans connected with Plymouth Colony
Native American people from Massachusetts
Native American leaders
17th-century Native Americans
Massachusett people
Native American history of Massachusetts
1633 deaths
Year of birth unknown